Cardioceras is an extinct ammonite genus belonging to the family Cardioceratidae. These fast-moving nektonic carnivores lived during the Jurassic period, Oxfordian age.

Description
The shape is circular, with ribs and a prominent ridge along the dorsal edge.

Distribution
Fossils of species within this genus have been found in the Jurassic of France, Germany, Poland, Russia, the United Kingdom and Alaska.

References

Jurassic ammonites
Ammonites of Europe
Ammonitida genera
Stephanoceratoidea